American actor Michael Keaton has been honored with numerous awards and nominations for his work in film and television. Keaton's lead performance in Birdman or (The Unexpected Virtue of Ignorance) (2014) earned him a Golden Globe Award for Best Actor in a Musical or Comedy and nominations for the Screen Actors Guild Award, British Academy Film Award, and Academy Award for Best Actor. He previously received a Golden Globe Award nomination for his performance in Live from Baghdad (2002) and a Screen Actors Guild Award nomination for The Company (2007).

Major associations

Academy Awards

British Academy Film Awards

Golden Globe Awards

Primetime Emmy Awards

Screen Actors Guild Awards

Other awards and nominations

AACTA Awards

Critics' Choice Awards

Gotham Awards

Independent Spirit Awards

MTV Movie Awards

Satellite Awards

Saturn Awards

Teen Choice Awards

Film critics awards

Others

References

Keaton, Michael